Geoff Plant,  (born c. 1956) is a British Columbia lawyer and retired politician known for his interest in citizen's legal and electoral rights and aboriginal rights.

As of 2010, he is chair of the board for Providence Health Care which operates St. Paul's Hospital. In May 2015 he was appointed as Emily Carr University of Art and Design's Chancellor.

Education
Raised in Vancouver, Plant received a B.A. from Harvard University in 1978 and law degrees from the University of Southampton in England in 1980, Dalhousie University in Halifax in 1981, and from the University of Cambridge in 1989. For a year, Plant was a clerk in the Supreme Court of Canada in Ottawa prior to being called to the bar in 1982.

Aboriginal rights
Plant was one of the 8 members of the legal team representing the Attorney General of British Columbia in Delgamuukw v British Columbia, 1991 BCSC 2372. This case was eventually overturned by the Supreme Court of Canada in Delgamuukw v British Columbia, [1997] 3 SCR 1010.

MLA and Attorney General
Plant has lived in Richmond since 1984 and represented the riding of Richmond-Steveston in the British Columbia Legislature for the BC Liberal Party. He was first elected as a Member of the Legislative Assembly in the 1996 election with 56 per cent of the vote. He served as Opposition Justice Critic and was Opposition Leader's Gordon Campbell's roommate in Victoria.

Plant was re-elected with 69 per cent of the vote in the 2001 election as part of Campbell's first-term government. He served as the Attorney General of British Columbia and Minister responsible for Treaty Negotiations from 2001 to 2005.

He was regarded as a moderate within Campbell's centre-right coalition who was keen on reforms for the legal, aboriginal treaty negotiation and electoral systems.

He oversaw the province-wide British Columbia Treaty Referendum in 2002 and the creation and oversight of the Citizens' Assembly on Electoral Reform. A policy change that affected whether domestic violence complaints would be automatically prosecuted did receive criticism from women's centres and was noted by the United Nations Committee on the Elimination of Discrimination Against Women. Cuts to legal aid prompted the Law Society to censure him. On the issue of polygamy in Bountiful, Plant cited constitutional concerns for religious rights but also formed an investigative team to research the situation.

When Plant chose not to run for a second term in government, he cited a wish to spend more time with his wife who was experiencing breast cancer. Upon his exit from provincial politics, he joined the law firm of Heenan Blaikie while maintaining government appointments as senior advisor in land and resource negotiations with the Council of the Haida Nation and for Campus 2020: a review of post-secondary education. He also has accepted a position as a sessional instructor at the University of Victoria Faculty of Law.

Campus 2020
Plant was appointed as a Special Advisor to the Premier and Minister of Advanced Education to lead a project called Campus 2020: Looking Ahead, the first comprehensive review of post-secondary education in British Columbia in over 40 years.

Civil City Commissioner 
In May 2007, Plant was appointed by Vancouver Mayor Sam Sullivan to the newly created position of Civil City Commissioner, a part-time job with a budget of $300,000. The position will lead Project Civil City, the mayor's effort to enhance public order in Vancouver's public areas by reducing homelessness, aggressive panhandling and the open drug market by at least 50 per cent by 2010.  There has been controversy regarding this position, with some expressing doubt as to its usefulness.

Miscellaneous
Plant was born with a cleft palate and has visible results of corrective surgery. The congenital disorder's effect on his speech was not a barrier to his succeeding in law and politics, two careers that require skillful verbal communication.

Plant was made a Member of the Order of British Columbia in 2022.

References

Living people
1956 births
Alumni of the University of Cambridge
Lawyers in British Columbia
British Columbia Liberal Party MLAs
Clerks of the Supreme Court of Canada
Schulich School of Law alumni
Harvard Law School alumni
Members of the Executive Council of British Columbia
Politicians from Vancouver
Attorneys General of British Columbia
Alumni of the University of Southampton
21st-century Canadian politicians